Paridea is a genus of skeletonizing leaf beetles in the family Chrysomelidae. There are more than 80 described species in Paridea. They are found in Indomalaya and the Palearctic.

Species
These 62 species, among others, belong to the genus Paridea:

 Paridea angulicollis (Motschulsky, 1853)
 Paridea avicauda (Laboissiere, 1930)
 Paridea bengalica Medvedev & Samoderzhenkov, 1998
 Paridea bhutanensis Kimoto, 1977
 Paridea bifurcata Jacoby, 1892
 Paridea biplagiata (Fairmaire, 1889)
 Paridea brachycornuta Yang, 1993
 Paridea breva Gressitt & Kimoto, 1963
 Paridea costallifera Yang, 1991
 Paridea costata (Chujo, 1935)
 Paridea crenata Yang, 1993
 Paridea cyanea Yang in Yang, 1992
 Paridea cyanipennis (Chujo, 1935)
 Paridea darjeelingensis Takizawa, 1990
 Paridea dohertyi (Maulik, 1936)
 Paridea epipleuralis (Chen, 1942)
 Paridea euryptera Yang, 1991
 Paridea fasciata Laboissiere, 1932
 Paridea flavipennis (Laboissiere, 1930)
 Paridea flavipoda Yang, 1991
 Paridea foveipennis Jacoby, 1892
 Paridea fujiana Yang, 1991
 Paridea fulva Kimoto, 1977
 Paridea fusca Yang, 1991
 Paridea glyphea Yang, 1993
 Paridea grandifolia Yang, 1991
 Paridea hirtipes Chen & Jiang, 1981
 Paridea houjayi Lee & Bezděk, 2014
 Paridea kaoi Lee & Bezděk, 2014
 Paridea lateralis Medvedev & Samoderzhenkov, 1989
 Paridea libita Yang, 1991
 Paridea livida Duvivier, 1892
 Paridea mimica Medvedev & Samoderzhenkov, 1998
 Paridea monticola (Gressitt & Kimoto, 1963)
 Paridea nepalica Medvedev & Samoderzhenkov, 1998
 Paridea nigra Yang, 1992
 Paridea nigricaudata Yang, 1991
 Paridea nigrimaculata Yang, 1991
 Paridea nigrimarginata Yang, 1991
 Paridea nigrocephala (Laboissiere, 1930)
 Paridea octomaculata (Baly, 1886)
 Paridea oculata Laboissiere, 1930
 Paridea pallida Bryant, 1954
 Paridea perplexa (Baly, 1879)
 Paridea plauta Yang, 1991
 Paridea quadrimaculata Kimoto, 2004
 Paridea recava Yang, 1991
 Paridea ruficollis Jacoby, 1892
 Paridea sancta Yang, 1991
 Paridea sauteri (Chûjô, 1935)
 Paridea sexmaculata (Laboissiere, 1930)
 Paridea sichuana Yang, 1991
 Paridea sikkimia Laboissiere, 1932
 Paridea sinensis (Laboissiere, 1930)
 Paridea taiwana (Chûjô, 1935)
 Paridea terminata Yang, 1991
 Paridea testacea (Gressitt & Kimoto, 1963)
 Paridea tetraspilota (Hope, 1831)
 Paridea transversofaciata (Laboissiere, 1930)
 Paridea tuberculata (Gressitt & Kimoto, 1963)
 Paridea unifasciata Jacoby, 1892
 Paridea yunnana Yang, 1991

References

External links

 

Galerucinae
Chrysomelidae genera
Taxa named by Joseph Sugar Baly